St Andrews Hill is a hillside suburb in south-east Christchurch, New Zealand.

History
The next 50 acres higher up the hill were purchased by the surveyor Robert Park, who later laid out the township of Ashburton. The land was later purchased by Major Alfred Hornbrook, who added it to his Mount Pleasant run. The Mount Pleasant run changed ownership to Richard May Morten, and upon his death in 1909, his sons Richard and Arthur Morten became trustees of the estate. The trustees broke up the run into numerous smaller lots and sold these at auction in March 1912.

In late 1920, ratepayers in the greater Mount Pleasant area petitioned to move their local council jurisdiction from the Borough of Sumner to Heathcote County, as the area was still mostly farmland. The petition was granted in early 1921.

Subdivision of the land began in 1925, after Peter Trolove and Walter de Thier purchased a block of 50 acres. They put four sections up for auction that year, but only sold one of them. The new owner formed a road and called it The Brae after his home in Scotland. Further subdivision started in 1930, when St Andrews Hill Road, Te Awakura Terrace, and 45 sections were surveyed. Trolove and de Thier called their subdivision after St Andrews Links, the famous golf course in Scotland. A further subdivision happened higher up the hill when the  Cannon Hill estate was bought by a syndicate in 1960.

Local government
In terms of local government, St Andrews Hill was originally seen as part of Mount Pleasant, which was administered by the Heathcote Road Board (originally East Heathcote Road Board) that was formed in 1864. In 1891, the area east of the Heathcote River was lost upon petition to the Sumner Borough. Heathcote became a county in 1911 and Mount Pleasant returned to Heathcote's administration in 1921. Moves for St Andrews Hill to secede to Christchurch City began in 1941, with the main issue a desire for better water supply. Most of the built up area transferred to the city in April 1943, with a further area following two years later.

Notes

References

Suburbs of Christchurch